Easkey Britton is an Irish surfer from Rossnowlagh, County Donegal. In 2010, she won her fifth consecutive Irish National Surfing Championship title at her namesake wave in County Sligo and in 2009 became the British Pro-Tour Champion.

Britton was the first female surfer to ride the "big wave," Aill na Searrach, off the Cliffs of Moher in 2007. The  wave was featured in the Irish documentary film Waveriders.

Britton is the first Irish woman to be nominated for the Billabong XXL Awards (now called the WSL Big Wave Awards) for her performance tow surfing at Ireland's premier big wave spot, Mullaghmore, in February 2011, becoming the first woman to do so.

Britton's younger sister Becky-Finn Britton is also a longboarder. Her cousin, Tahlia Britton, became the
first female diver in the Irish Navy in August 2020.

References

External links
 Easkey Britton website
Finisterre
Waves of Freedom

Living people
Irish surfers
Irish female surfers
Sportspeople from County Donegal
Year of birth missing (living people)